Leptogium teretiusculum is a species of lichen belonging to the family Collemataceae.

It is native to Europe and Northern America.

References

teretiusculum
Lichen species
Lichens of Europe
Lichens of North America
Lichens described in 1892